The Ministry of Health and Social Protection is a government ministry that governs and manages healthcare and the health industry in Tajikistan, including the nation's public health system. The Ministry was founded in 2006 and is located in Dushanbe.

Structure

 Central Administration
 Health Service Department
 Human Resource and Science Department
 Health Reform and External Relations Department
 Mother and Child Health and Family Planning Department
 Economics and Health Budget Planning Department
 Pharmacy and Medical Supplies Department
 Sanitary Epidemiological Surveillance Department
 Accounting Department
 Legal Department
 Disaster Preparedness and Emergency Care Department
 Internal Audit Department
 Administrative Department
 Human Resource Department
 Health Department of Gorno-Badakhshan Autonomous Region, the Oblasts and Dushanbe
 State Pharmaceutical Activity Surveillance Centre
 State Sanitary Epidemiological Surveillance Center

Agencies and Organizations

 National Health Centre
 National Diagnostic Centre
 National Reproductive Health Centre
 National Drug Abuse Monitoring and Prevention Centre
 State Tajik Postgraduate Education of Health Professionals
 Tajik Research Institute of Obstetrics, Gynecology and Pediatrics
 Tajik Research Centre of Preventive Medicine
 Scientific Centre of Cardiovascular and Chest Surgery
 Scientific Blood Centre
 Scientific-Clinical Stomatology Centre
 Scientific-Training Centre of Plastic Surgery
 Oncologic Scientific Centre
 Clinical Centre of Mental Health
 Child and Adolescent Mental Health Centre
 Clinical Hospital of Mental Health Diseases
 Clinical Centre of Skin and Veneral Diseases
 Clinical Narcology Centre
 Clinical Centre of Ophthalmic Diseases
 Clinical Cardiology Centre
 Clinical Centre of Urinology
 Centre of Spinal Diseases
 Centre of Folk Medicine
 Endocrine Clinical Centre
 Nursing Centre
 State Unitary Enterprise TajikPharmIndustry
 Shifo Magazine
 Tajikistan Health Magazine

Educational institutions 

 Avicenna Tajik State Medical University
 Republican Medical College (Dushanbe)
 Medical College (Bokhtar)
 Medical College (Kulab)
 Medical College (Khujand)
 Medical School (Hisor)
 Medical School (Vahdat)
 Medical School (Rasht District)
 Medical School (Yova)
 Medical Schools (Dangara District)
 Medical School (Konibodom)
 Medical School (Istaravshan)
 Medical School (Panjakent)
 Medical School  (Khorugh)
 Medical School (Tursunzoda)

List of Ministers
Nasim Olimzoda (2017-5 May 2020)
Jamoliddin Abdullozoda (since 5 May 2020)

See also
 Government of Tajikistan
 Health in Tajikistan

References

External links
 Ministry of Health
 United Nations Tajikistan Information Platform - Health sector

Health in Tajikistan
Tajikistan
Dushanbe
Tajikistan, Health
Government ministries of Tajikistan
2006 establishments in Asia